FC Fleury 91 Cœur d'Essonne is a French women's football club based in Fleury-Mérogis. The club is the female section of Championnat National 2 men's club FC Fleury 91. The club was originally founded in 2003 as FCF Val d'Orge, but was then renamed in 2017 after joining with the men's club. They currently play in the Division 1 Féminine, the first division of women's football in France. They have played in this league since 2017.

History  
The club was founded in 2003 initially to train two teams of young female players. The next season, they fused with a senior team. In 2006, the senior team reached the Division d'Honneur. In 2012, they were promoted to Division 2 in 2012.

In 2017, after winning the Division 2 season, then-FCF Val d'Orge was promoted to Division 1 Féminine. The club then joined with FC Fleury 91 and was renamed.

Honours
Division 2 Féminine Champions: 2017

Players

First team squad

Former players

References

External links 
 Official website 
 Former official website 
 Official Facebook page 

Women's football clubs in France
Association football clubs established in 2017
2017 establishments in France
Division 1 Féminine clubs
Sport in Essonne
Football clubs in Île-de-France